The 2012 Asian Wrestling Championships were held at the Park Chung-hee Gymnasium in Gumi, South Korea. The event took place from February 16 to February 19, 2012.

Medal table

Team ranking

Medal summary

Men's freestyle

Men's Greco-Roman

Women's freestyle

Participating nations 
244 competitors from 22 nations competed.

 (1)
 (21)
 (16)
 (19)
 (14)
 (7)
 (21)
 (5)
 (21)
 (21)
 (14)
 (5)
 (3)
 (21)
 (4)
 (10)
 (3)
 (8)
 (3)
 (18)
 (7)
 (2)

References
Results Book

External links
Official website

Asia
Asian Wrestling Championships
W
International wrestling competitions hosted by South Korea